Suite of Dances is a ballet made by New York City Ballet ballet master Jerome Robbins from his 1974 Dybbuk Variations, which was itself a "cut" version of his Dybbuk from the same year. Suite of Dances' premiere took place on 17 January 1980 at the New York State Theater, Lincoln Center. The eponymous 1974 music to all three versions is that of Leonard Bernstein.

Cast

Original 
Patricia McBride
Helgi Tomasson

1981 
Bart Cook

Reviews 
NY Times review, Jennifer Dunning, January 25, 1981

Ballets by Jerome Robbins
Ballets to the music of Leonard Bernstein
1980 ballet premieres
New York City Ballet repertory
Orchestral suites